In mechanical horology, a remontoire (from the French remonter, meaning 'to wind') is a small secondary source of power, a weight or spring, which runs the timekeeping mechanism and is itself periodically rewound by the timepiece's main power source, such as a mainspring.  It was used in a few precision clocks and watches to place the source of power closer to the escapement, thereby increasing the accuracy by evening out variations in drive force caused by unevenness of the friction in the geartrain.  In spring-driven precision clocks, a gravity remontoire is sometimes used to replace the uneven force delivered by the mainspring running down by the more constant force of gravity acting on a weight.  In turret clocks, it serves to separate the large forces needed to drive the hands from the modest forces needed to drive the escapement which keeps the pendulum swinging.  A remontoire should not be confused with a maintaining power spring, which is used only to keep the timepiece going while it is being wound.

How it works
Remontoires are used because the timekeeping mechanism in clocks and watches, the pendulum or balance wheel, is never isochronous; its rate is affected by changes in the drive force applied to it.  In spring-driven timepieces, the drive force declines as the mainspring runs down.  In weight-driven clocks the drive force, provided by a weight suspended by a cord, is more constant,  but imperfections in the gear train and variations in lubrication also cause small variations.   In turret clocks, the large hands, which are attached to the clock's wheel train, are exposed to the weather on the outside of the tower, so winds and accumulations of ice and snow apply disturbing forces to the hands, which are passed on to the wheel train.

With a remontoire, the only force applied to the clock's escapement is that of the remontoire's spring or weight, so that it is isolated from any variations in the main power source or wheel train, which is just used to rewind the remontoire.   Remontoires are designed to rewind frequently, at intervals between fifteen seconds and an hour.  The rewinding process is triggered automatically when the remontoire's weight or spring reaches the end of its power.  This frequent rewinding is another source of accuracy, because it averages out any variations in the clock's rate due to changes in the force of the remontoire itself.  If the rate of the clock varies as the remontoire spring runs down, this variation will be repeated again and again, each time the remontoire goes through its cycle, so it will have no effect on the long term rate of the clock.

History
The gravity remontoire was invented by Swiss clockmaker Jost Burgi around 1595. Usually the "Kalenderuhr" (three month running, springdriven,  calendar-desk-clock) Burgi is considered the oldest surviving clock with a remontoire, even if it does not provide power to the escapement during the few seconds of the daily cycle where the remontoire weight gets wound up by the spring.  Today remontoire mechanisms are all designed to deliver power to the escapement during the remontoire reset cycle.

The spring remontoire was invented by English clockmaker John Harrison during development of his H2 marine chronometer in 1739. Harrison's working drawing of the device is preserved in the Library of the Worshipful Company of Clockmakers in London, England.

Many French and Swiss pocketwatches after 1860 were stamped on the back with the word Remontoire.  This merely meant that they didn't have to be wound with a key (i.e. they were wound by the then-novel winding crown inside the pendant).  Etymologically the term is correct, the mainspring is "rewound" by some other force than a key, but these watches usually do not contain a remontoire as the word is used today.

Types
Remontoires are distinguished by their power source:
A gravity remontoire is one that uses a weight for power.  It is used in precision pendulum clocks.
A spring remontoire uses a spring.  It is the only type which can be used in watches, since the force of a weight would be disturbed by motions of the wearer's wrist
An electric remontoire can be either a gravity or spring type.  In it, the weight or spring is rewound electrically, with a motor or solenoid.  It is used in clocks with traditional mechanical movements which are run on electricity.
They can also be classified by where in the wheel train the remontoire is located:
An escapement remontoire applies its force directly to the escape wheel of the escapement.  Spring remontoires were usually of this type.
A train remontoire applies its force to one of the wheels upstream from the escapement, usually to the wheel that drives the escape wheel.

Electric remontoires in automobile clocks

Before the common use of electronic clocks in automobiles, automobile clocks had mechanical movements, powered by an electric remontoire.  A low power drive spring would be wound every few minutes by a plunger in a solenoid, powered by the vehicle's service battery and activated by a switch when the spring tension got too low. Such clocks were, however, notoriously inaccurate, typically being made as cheaply as possible.

Many Rover (P4 to P6), Ford (Mk1 Escort, Mk2 Cortina, and Mk1 Capri GT/RS), and Triumph (Dolomite, 2000/2500, and Stag), as well as some Jaguar (S2 E-type), Daimler (DS420), and Aston Martin (V8) cars were fitted with Kienzle clocks that were wound by such electric remontoires.

Footnotes

External links 
 WAGNER DETAIL

Horology